The  was a professional wrestling world heavyweight championship owned by New Japan Pro-Wrestling (NJPW) that existed from 1987. This article covers the interpretation of the title's history according to Inoki Genome Federation (IGF) and its founder Antonio Inoki. Both promotions agreed on the title's history up to July 15, 2006, when Brock Lesnar, who was the reigning champion, was stripped of the title by NJPW. Inoki saw this event as an error made by NJPW and spawned the IGF version of the title's history, with Lesnar still recognized as the official champion.

IGF was a territory of the National Wrestling Alliance (NWA), thus the title was additionally recognized by the NWA. The title also saw the involvement of Total Nonstop Action Wrestling (TNA), which also recognized it as the IWGP Heavyweight Championship and assisted in the title's retirement in 2008 when it was unified with NJPW's IWGP Heavyweight Championship.

As a professional wrestling championship, the title was won via a scripted ending to a match or awarded to a wrestler because of a storyline. All title changes occurred at IGF- or NJPW-promoted events. There were a total of three reigns among three wrestlers during the title's brief history.

History
On October 8, 2005, at New Japan Pro-Wrestling's (NJPW) Toukon Souzou New Chapter event in Tokyo, Japan, Brock Lesnar defeated Kazuyuki Fujita and Masahiro Chono in a Three Way match for the IWGP Heavyweight Championship. He held the title for 280 days, having three successful defenses, until he failed to show up for a scheduled title defense. NJPW thus stripped Lesnar of the championship on July 15, 2006. Lesnar cited visa issues along with NJPW owing him compensation as his reasons for failing to appear at the planned title defense. After this series of events, NJPW founder Antonio Inoki left NJPW and created a new promotion, Inoki Genome Federation (IGF). Inoki then recognized Lesnar as the IWGP Heavyweight Champion due to Lesnar never having lost the championship in a match and Lesnar still maintaining physical possession of the title belt. NJPW recognized Lesnar as the IWGP 3rd Belt Champion and not the IWGP Heavyweight Champion, maintaining their stance on having stripped him of the title in 2006.

On June 29, 2007, IGF held its debut show with Lesnar defending the IWGP Heavyweight Championship against Kurt Angle in the main event. Angle defeated Lesnar to win the championship and went on to appear in the American Total Nonstop Action Wrestling (TNA) promotion with the physical title belt. TNA also referred to the title belt as the IWGP Heavyweight Championship in the same manner as IGF, recognizing Angle as the official IWGP Heavyweight Champion. NJPW did not recognize Angle as the IWGP Heavyweight Champion, instead it viewed Angle as the second IWGP 3rd Belt holder.

Angle went on to have two successful defenses as champion. His first defense came in TNA in a feud against Samoa Joe. Angle first appeared with the title belt in TNA on the July 5, 2007, episode of TNA's television program TNA Impact!. The title belt became relevant to the storyline rivalry between Joe and Angle heading into TNA's Hard Justice pay-per-view (PPV) event. Leading up to TNA's Victory Road PPV event on July 15, 2007, TNA X Division Champion Joe and TNA World Heavyweight Champion Angle teamed together to face TNA World Tag Team Champions Team 3D (Brother Devon and Brother Ray) in a Tag Team match with the stipulation being whoever scored the pinfall or submission for their team won the championship of the person pinned or made to submit. Joe pinned Brother Ray in the bout, thus winning the World Tag Team Championship for himself and a partner of his choosing. Joe chose to hold the title alone and challenged Angle to a Winner Take All match at Hard Justice for the TNA World Heavyweight, TNA X Division, TNA World Tag Team, and the IWGP Heavyweight Championships on the July 19 2007, episode of Impact!. Angle accepted the match, with Joe and Angle facing at Hard Justice on August 12, 2007 in Orlando, Florida for all of the titles. Angle defeated Joe at the event to win the TNA World Tag Team and TNA X Division Championships, while retaining the TNA World Heavyweight and IWGP Heavyweight Championships.

Afterwards, TNA slowly fazed out the IWGP Heavyweight Championship from their programming with Angle going on to defend the title at IGF shows. With NJPW and TNA forming a working relationship, Angle also defended the title at NJPW shows, where the title was referred to as the IWGP 3rd Belt. Angle's second defense of the title was at NJPW's Wrestle Kingdom II in Tokyo Dome event on January 4, 2008, where he defeated former NJPW-recognized IWGP Heavyweight Champion Yuji Nagata to retain the IWGP 3rd Belt. Angle's third defense was against then-NJPW-recognized IWGP Heavyweight Champion Shinsuke Nakamura in a unification match on February 17, 2008 at NJPW's Circuit 2008 New Japan ISM event. Angle lost the match and the existence of the IGF-recognized IWGP Heavyweight Championship ended. IGF later introduced another title five years later with the IGF Championship on December 31, 2013.

Belt designs
The title design featured a black leather base with five gold plates spaced evenly apart and the center plate being the largest. On the center plate, the words "IWGP Heavyweight Champion" were featured alongside the caricature of an eagle or similar bird of prey.

Reigns
The inaugural champion was Brock Lesnar, as recognized by IGF as the official IWGP Heavyweight Champion. There were a total of three reigns among three wrestlers during the title's brief history before being unified with the IWGP Heavyweight Championship.

Footnotes

References
General

Specific

External links
IGF.jp
Total Nonstop Action Wrestling website

New Japan Pro-Wrestling championships
World heavyweight wrestling championships